Metropolis is the name of a classical city situated in western Turkey near Yeniköy village in Torbali municipality - approximately 40 km SE of Izmir. Occupation at the site Bademgediği Tepe goes back to the Neolithic period, and in the Late Bronze Age was known under the Hittites as Puranda. It often is referred to as the "City of the Mother Goddess". The Hittite period is also attested.

Classical, Hellenistic, Roman, Byzantine, and Ottoman periods are well represented at the site.

History 
The earliest known settlement at the site is from the Neolithic showing evidence of contact and influence with the Troy I littoral culture (needed reference).

Late Bronze Age 
The Luwian kingdom of Arzawa had its capital Apasas (later Ephesus) some 30 km to the south west, of which this city was part.

Hittite Influence
The Hittites knew the city as Puranda. An as yet undeciphered seal written in hieroglyphics similar to those of the Hittites has been found in the acropolis of Metropolis.

Mycenaean Influence
Mycenaean remains are also found. Bademgedigi Tepe is the archaeological site in the area with large amounts of local Mycenaean pottery, ranging from the 14th to 12th century BC, and later. A Mycenaean-age representation of a ship on a vase from Bademgediği Tepe is an important find that casts light on the development of ship technology and iconography on ceramic vessels.

Hellenistic Period 
Metropolis was a part of the Hellenistic kingdom of Pergamum and during this period the city reached a zenith of cultural and economic life. A temple dedicated to the war god Ares, one of only two known such temples, has been located at this site.

The city was noted by numerous classical authors including Strabo and Ptolemy, and described as a town in the Caystrian plain in Lydia, on the road from Smyrna to Ephesus, at a distance of 120 stadia from Ephesus, and 180 from Smyrna. Strabo relates that the district of Metropolis produced excellent wine. The town was still noted by Byzantine authors such as Stephanus of Byzantium and Hierocles.

What is visible today is primarily a Hellenistic city heavily Romanised, and with Byzantine remains laid across it – a church to the east of the city, and fortification walls laid across the city that connect to the Hellenistic defenses on the Acropolis.

Excavations 
The city was first investigated through archaeological field work from 1972 by Professor Recep Meriç from the Dokuz Eylül University, Izmir. Metropolis has been excavated since 1989.

In 1995, archaeologists discovered a Hellenistic marble seat of honor with griffins in the Ancient Theatre. The original seat of honor is displayed at the İzmir Archeological Museum and a replica has been placed at the theatre.

In June 2021, archaeologists announced the discovery of a well-preserved 1,800-year-old marble statue of a woman standing on a pedestal in Torbalı district. The head and two arms of the statue were missing.

Notes

Bibliography 
Books
Aybek, S., Metropolis İonia I: Heykel, Metropolis'de Hellenistik ve Roma Dönemi Heykeltıraşlığı, İstanbul, 2009.
Aybek, S., Ekin Meriç, A., Öz, A. K., Metropolis: A Mother Goddess City in Ionia, İstanbul, 2009.
Aybek, S., Ekin Meriç, A., Öz, A. K., Metropolis: İonia'da Bir Ana Tanrıça Kenti, İstanbul, 2009.
Meriç, R., Metropolis, City of the Mother Goddess, İstanbul, 2003.
Meriç, R., Metropolis, Ana Tanrıça Kenti, İstanbul, 2003.
Meriç, R., Späthellenistisch-römische Keramik und Kleinfunde aus einem Scachtbrunnen am Staatsmarkt in Ephesos, Wien, 2002.
Meriç, R., Metropolis Kazılarının İlk 5 Yılı, İstanbul, 1996.
Meriç, R., Metropolis, İstanbul, 1992.
Meriç, R., Metropolis in Ionien: Ergebnisse einer Survey-Unternehmung in den Jahren 1972–1975, Königstein, 1982.
Articles
Herling, L., Kasper, K., Lichter, C., Meriç, R., Im Westen nichts Neues? Ergebnisse der Grabungen 2003–2004 in Dedecik-Heybelitepe, Istanbuler Mitteilungen, 58, s. 13-65, 2008.
Meriç, R., “Metropolis”, W. Radt ed. içinde, Byzas 3; Stadtgrabungen und Stadtforschung im westlichen Kleinasien, 2006, s. 227-240.
Meriç, R., “Excavation at Bademgeiği Tepe (Puranda) 1999–2002: A Preliminary Report, Istanbuler Mitteilungen, 2003, s. 79-98.
Meriç, R., Mountjoy, P., “Three Mycenaean Vases from Ionia”, Istanbuler Mitteilungen, 51, 2001, s. 133-137.
Meriç, R., Mountjoy, P. (2002), “Mycenaean Pottery from Bademgedigi Tepe (Puranda) in Ionia: A Preliminary Report.” Istanbul Mitteilungen 52:79–98
Meriç, R., Schachner, A., “Ein Stempelsiegel des spaeten 2. Jahrtausends v. Chr. aus Metropolis in Ionien”, Studi Micenei ed Egeo-Anatolici, XLII/1-2000, s. 85-102.

External links 

The Official Site of Metropolis Excavations
Kulturhistorisk Museum Universitetet i Oslo Metropolis Page
Facebook Group of Metropolis Excavations

Tells (archaeology)
Archaeological sites in the Aegean Region
Former populated places in Turkey
Greek colonies in Anatolia
Ancient Greek archaeological sites in Turkey
Buildings and structures in İzmir Province
History of İzmir Province
Members of the Delian League
Greek city-states
Populated places in ancient Ionia
Populated places in ancient Lydia
Neolithic sites
Torbalı District